A Public Display of Affection is the debut album from Irish band The Blizzards. All lyrics were written by Niall Breslin and all the music was by The Blizzards.

Track listing
 "Freaky"
 "Miss Fantasia Preaches"
 "Trouble"
 "Fantasy"
 "War of Words"
 "On the Right Track"
 "Why Do You Fancy Scumbags?"
 "Dangerous Bitches"
 "Superdrug"
 "Black Hole"
 "The Carney Code"
 "Call Me a Priest"

Bonus track: "First Girl to Leave Town"

2006 debut albums
The Blizzards albums
Albums produced by Michael Beinhorn